Since 1996, there has been an unusually high number of cases involving young women disappearing along U.S. Route 29 (US 29) in Virginia, or an area known as the "Route 29 Corridor". Five young women disappeared in five years between 2009 and 2014, earning it a particularly notorious reputation.

Route 29 
Route 29 is a United States federal highway that stretches from Pensacola, Florida to Silver Spring, Maryland. It was originally constructed in October 1925. Currently, U.S. Route 29 stretches around 1,036 miles up and down the East coast. It has also been more recently known for a number of disappearances since 1996.

Serial Killer Along Route 29 
Richard Marc Evonitz was a serial killer active in the area from 1996 until 2002. While it was never confirmed, Evonitz was also suspected of being the Route 29 Stalker. In hindsight, detectives had claimed that it was highly unlikely to have multiple offenders in one area at one time. Evonitz was involved in the murder of three girls from Spotsylvania County, Virginia and the kidnapping and assault of a teenage girl in South Carolina. In addition, Evonitz was also suspected of two rapes prior to his offenses in Spotsylvania County. This was never confirmed.

In June 2002, Evonitz committed suicide while surrounded by police.

The Route 29 "Stalker" 
The route 29 stalker was never caught nor identified after over 20 years. Police and investigators are still unsure whether the route 29 stalker was Richard Marc Evonitz, the serial killer active in the area around the same time.

According to witnesses on Route 29, the unidentified stalker would flag down women who appeared to be driving alone. The incidents reported of the Route 29 stalker occurred between Manassas, Virginia and Charlottesville, Virginia.

Cases

Alicia Showalter Reynolds
Alicia Showalter Reynolds disappeared on her drive to Charlottesville, Virginia to shop with her mother in 1996. Sources say Reynolds never made it to her destination. Alicia is thought to be the first of many disappearances along U.S. Route 29.

Police claim Alicia's killer must have known the area in which her body was found. Alicia's remains were found in what was said to be the middle of an isolated field that sources claim only a local could have known about in Culpeper County. Neighbors of the area say they only found the remains once they noticed vultures circling the area, however, the police stated she was most likely murdered the day she was abducted. Originally, officials believe Alicia was a victim of Richard Marc Evonitz, a serial killer active during her disappearance. This was never confirmed, and Reynolds' case still remains cold today.

Julianne Williams and Laura "Lollie" Winans
Julianne Williams, 24, and Laura "Lollie" Winans, 26, were found dead at their campsite in Shenandoah National Park in May 1996.

Anne Carolyn McDaniel
20-year-old Anne Carolyn McDaniel was last seen leaving a group home in the town of Orange on September 18, 1996. Her burned remains were found four days later within just  of the location where Alicia Showalter Reynolds's body was found.

Morgan Dana Harrington
Morgan Dana Harrington was a 20-year-old student at Virginia Tech when she disappeared from Charlottesville near John Paul Jones Arena while attending a Metallica concert on October 17, 2009. Her body was found at Anchorage Farm in Albemarle County months later on January 26, 2010. On September 15, 2015, Jesse Matthew was formally charged with first degree murder and abduction with intent to defile in the murder of Morgan Harrington.

Samantha Ann Clarke
19-year-old Samantha Clarke was last seen in Orange shortly after midnight on September 13, 2010. On Friday, January 15, 2021, the Town of Orange Police Department reclassified her disappearance as a murder. “Due to new information and advances in investigative and forensic technology, Samantha’s missing person investigation has been reclassified as an active abduction and murder investigation,” according to OPD Chief.

Sage Smith
Sage Smith, also known as Dashad and Unique, was a 19-year-old transgender woman last seen in Charlottesville on November 20, 2012, waiting for a date very close to the location where Alexis Murphy's abandoned car was found in August 2013. Sage Smith's case went cold and remains unsolved.  Erik McFadden remains a missing person of interest in the case.

Alexis Tiara Murphy
The Alexis Murphy abduction occurred on August 3, 2013, when the 17-year-old went missing after leaving her home in Shipman reportedly headed to Lynchburg. She was seen on security footage at a gas station in Lovingston, Virginia and her car was later found outside a theater off US 29 in Charlottesville. Her remains were discovered on private property on December 20, 2020 and were positively identified by a Virginia crime lab on February 5, 2021. Law enforcement waited to announce confirmation to the public until February 17, 2021 in order to allow the family time to grieve & make proper arrangements. Despite not knowing the location of Alexis' body until 2020, a suspect was taken into custody and charged with her abduction in 2013. Randy Taylor was later found guilty of first-degree murder in the commission of an abduction and abduction with intent to defile in connection with the disappearance of Murphy.

Hannah Graham
The disappearance of Hannah Graham occurred very early on the morning of September 13, 2014, when the 18-year-old University of Virginia student went missing and was last seen at the Downtown Mall in Charlottesville. On September 24, 2014, Jesse L. Matthew was arrested in Galveston County, Texas, while being wanted for the abduction and abduction with intent to defile Graham. On October 18, 2014, Graham's remains were found at an abandoned property in Albemarle County, Virginia. Jesse L. Matthew was scheduled to appear in court on December 4, 2014. Jessie Matthew entered an Alford plea and was sentenced to three life terms.

Potential links between cases
Given the short time frame and similarities between the cases, specifically the small geographic region where they occurred and the age and gender of the victims, it is often wondered whether the cases are linked.

The main suspect in Reynolds's disappearance is a man from Maryland named Darrel Rice who people believe is the "Route 29 Stalker". The stalker was reported to have flagged down women in an attempt to get them to pull over onto the side of the road by citing mechanical problems with their cars.

Taylor, the man charged with the abduction of Murphy, was a friend of Clarke's and is known to have called her cell phone several times on the night of her disappearance, but he has never been charged with anything in relation to her case. Despite many people suggesting Taylor was the Route 29 Stalker, police have said there is nothing linking him to the case and, as well, Taylor was in prison when Reynolds was killed.

Jesse Matthew, the man arrested in the disappearance of Hannah Graham, has been linked forensically by DNA, suggesting he had some contact with Harrington on the night of her disappearance, police have said. At the request of Taylor's attorney, police tested Murphy's car and checked her social media history to see if she had had any contact with Matthew.

References

1990s missing person cases
2010s missing person cases
Missing person cases in Virginia
People murdered in Virginia
Serial murders in the United States
U.S. Route 29
Unidentified serial killers
Women in Virginia